Jacopo Marieschi (1711–1794) was a Venetian history painter.  Formerly he was confused with the prominent vedute painter, Michele Marieschi, his close contemporary.

He was also called Giacomo Marieschi. He painted allegorical figures of Faith, Hope, and Charity at San Francesco della Vigna.

References

18th-century Italian painters
Italian male painters
Painters from Venice
1711 births
1794 deaths
18th-century Italian male artists